Colonel Abdulla Ibrahim is a staff officer of Maldives National Defence Force and the commandant of Maldives Presidential Guard (PG).

Abdulla Ibrahim held commands in Maldives National Defence Force including the Commander Coast Guard Services, Commanding officer of Maldives Fire and Rescue Services, Commanding Officer of the Southern Region, Commanding Officer of the Central Region and Commanding Officer of Rapid Reaction Forces Maldives.

References 

Maldivian military personnel
Living people
Year of birth missing (living people)
People from Malé